MGA can refer to:

Transport
MGA, IATA code for Augusto C. Sandino International Airport (Managua International Airport) in Managua, Nicaragua
Monongahela Railway, a former coal-hauling short line railroad in the United States
The MG MGA, a popular British sports car manufactured between 1955 and 1962 by MG

Business and finance
 Malagasy ariary, currency of Madagaskar by ISO 4217 currency code
Managing general agent, a type of insurance agent
Mutual Gains Approach, a process model for negotiating while protecting relationships and reputation

Biology and health care
 3-Methylglutaconic aciduria, a metabolic disorder
Mga (protein), a DNA-binding protein found in Streptococcus pyogenes (group A Streptococcus)
Mga, max dimerization protein, a protein in humans encoded by the MGA gene
Megestrol acetate or melengestrol acetate, progestin medications

Geography
Map Grid of Australia, a mapping system based on the Universal Transverse Mercator coordinate system
Mga (river) in Leningrad Oblast, Russia
Mga, an urban-type settlement in Leningrad Oblast, Russia

Information technology
Matrox, producer of video card components
Monochrome Graphics Adapter, either related to or synonymous with the Hercules Graphics Card
Multigenerational architecture, a method of database transactions handling related to multiversion concurrency control

Education
 Master of Governmental Administration, a degree program offered by the Fels Institute of Government
Master of Global Affairs, a degree program offered by the Munk School of Global Affairs and Public Policy at the University of Toronto

Arts

 Monash Gallery of Art, Melbourne, Australia.

Organizations
Malta Gaming Authority, Malta's gaming control board
Midwestern Governors Association, a nonprofit organization of the 12 American Midwest states' governors
A subsidiary of Mitsubishi

Entertainment
Marriott's Great America, earlier name of Great America, former name of amusement parks
Metal Gear Acid, a PlayStation Portable video game by Konami
Metal Gear Arcade, a reworked arcade version of the Metal Gear Online video game by Konami
MGA Entertainment, a toy production company
Mint Green Army, the football team of St Anne's College, Oxford

Linguistics
In the Filipino language, "mga" (pronounced as [mɐˈŋa]) is used as a prefix to pluralize nouns.